
Gmina Baboszewo is a rural gmina (administrative district) in Płońsk County, Masovian Voivodeship, in east-central Poland.

Villages
Gmina Baboszewo contains the villages and settlements of Baboszewo, Bożewo, Brzeście, Brzeście Małe, Brzeście Nowe, Budy Radzymińskie, Cieszkowo Nowe, Cieszkowo Stare, Cieszkowo-Kolonia, Cywiny Wojskie, Cywiny-Dynguny, Dłużniewo, Dramin, Dziektarzewo, Galomin, Galominek, Galominek Nowy, Goszczyce Poświętne, Goszczyce Średnie, Jarocin, Jesionka, Kiełki, Korzybie, Kowale, Krościn, Kruszewie, Lachówiec, Lutomierzyn, Mystkowo, Niedarzyn, Pawłowo, Pieńki Rzewińskie, Polesie, Rybitwy, Rzewin, Sarbiewo, Sokolniki Nowe, Sokolniki Stare, Śródborze, Wola Dłużniewska, Wola-Folwark and Zbyszyno.

Neighbouring gminas
Gmina Baboszewo is bordered by the gminas of Dzierzążnia, Glinojeck, Płońsk, Raciąż, Sochocin and Staroźreby.

References

Polish official population figures 2006

Baboszewo
Płońsk County